JD Era (born April 15, 1985) is a Canadian rapper and lyricist.  He has worked with artists such as Nas, Gza, Kardinal Offishall, The Clipse, and has also cut several tracks with longtime friend Drake. In 2008 he won Best Rap at the Toronto Independent Music Awards, and also won the TAG Records’ Survival of The Freshest competition. He has also released a number of mixtapes and singles, and in the Juno Awards of 2013 his album No Handouts was nominated for Rap Recording of the Year.

Early life
JD Era was born on April 15, 1985 and raised in Missisauga, a suburb of Toronto, Ontario. He began listening to rap at a young age, particularly to groups such as Wu Tang Clan and the song "C.R.E.A.M." Rapping by the age of fourteen, he began writing his own rhymes at sixteen. He started freestyling in local rap battles as he grew older, stating "I always knew in the back of my mind that I would do [rap]. Rap was taking up too much time and money for me to not take it seriously. I just always wanted to get better and loved the music." A friend, Bad Nuze, brought him into his studio for a number of recording sessions, and JD Era stated "I never looked back." About his name, "JD is my initials and Era is a timeline. Just my way of saying its my time." Around 2003 he signed with his long-term manager, Mike "Major" Malabre of The Product.

Music career

2005-10: Early years
JD Era has stated that one of his earlier difficulties was going from being a battling Emcee to writing his own full songs. In 2005 he recorded his first singles: "Ride Clean" and "Take Me Home." They became his first songs to receive airplay on urban radio stations, including Flow 93.5 and 91.5 The Beat. His first mixtape, Prince of the North, was released on July 14, 2007, on The Product and Black Market Music. A single from the album, "Paper Chase," had a music video filmed as well, increasing his exposure nationally.

In 2008 he was nominated for two DJ Stylus Awards, and that year at the Toronto Independent Music Awards he won Best Rap. He continued to freestyle even as he worked in the recording studio, and also in 2008 he was named winner of the TAG Records’ Survival of The Freshest freestyle competition. He was also later named the Champion at the Marc Ecko Freestyle Competition. Around 2008, Major, JD Era, and Fase became co-owners in Black Market Music Group, which has ties with Universal Music Group.

His track "25th Hour" was included in the mixtape Dame Hustle The Hip Hop Experiment by Stricklee Hip Hop in February 2009. Around 2010 he was a member of the group Wise Guys, along with Bishop Brigante, Ken Masters, Jonny Roxx, Young Tony (aka Hush) and Drake. According to Hip Hop Canada, "The group’s biggest claim to fame as a unit was several diss songs including 'Goodnight & Goodluck' and 'Good Riddance.'"

He released the mixtape I'm Coming to America in 2010 on Black Market, which increased his exposure in the United States, and had production from artists such as Drake. At Flow 93.5’s Real Frequency Awards, Coming to America was nominated as Best Mixtape.

2011-12: Th1rt3en-Black Tape, touring
JD Era released his mixtape Th1rt3en-Black Tape on February 22, 2011, through Black Market and Universal Canada. The music videos for the mixtape's tracks "You Know This and "Fame & Fortune" both charted on Much Music and other music countdowns.

For 2011 and 2012 he wrote the theme song for The Score network's Court Surfing NBA program, which was broadcast in Canada. On April 26, 2011, Black Market released "The Score: Couch Surfing Theme," later followed by the second season's version.

He and his manager met Raekwon in April 2011 at a show in Winnipeg, stating"He had heard my name going around the city and wanted to meet me." Later that summer they toured together with 13 dates in Canada and forty in the United States. On January 17, 2012, JD Era self-released the single "Payday 2," which featured Raekwon. By May 2012 he was touring across Canada, having at that point been to British Columbia, Winnipeg, Montreal and Saskatchewan. By the summer of 2012 he had wrapped his Unexpected Victory Tour with Raekwon. As of 2012, he is the only Canadian artist signed to ICE20, the record label associated with Raekwon.

2012-13: No Handouts
In 2012 he also began working on his next album. Raekwon assisted with A&R, with producers such as 9th Wonder, Lex Luger, and Burd X Keyz. No Handouts was released on October 2, 2012, on Black Market. An invite-only listening party for the album, however, had been held at the IC H20 office in Toronto on May 1.  Several videos were filmed for the album, including for the track "Smoking Good." He later toured in support of the album across Canada, and in the Juno Awards of 2013 No Handouts was nominated for the Rap Recording of the Year.

2013-present: Singles, Barz Vol. 1
In July 2013 he was a guest artist on the Tony Touch track "Unorthodox," also featuring Ghostface Killah, RZA, and Raekwon. The track's album reached #14 on Top Rap Albums. On August 6, 2013, he and Bishop Lamont also were guest artists on "Kill Kill Kill" by Mad Child, included on the album Lawn Mower Man, which reached #3 on the Canadian charts.

In December 2013, former collaborator Bishop Brigante joined JD Era on the Toronto stop of Era's Do You Know Mary? Tour. The tour later traveled to Ontario, with other guests such as Rich Kidd. In January 2014, he headlined a show with Honey Cocaine, and the next month played four Ontario dates while headlining with Rich Kidd. He has performed live with artists such as Nas, GZA, Kardinal Offishall, Tyga, Drake, Method Man, Red Man, Raekwon, Rick Ross, Busta Rhymes, Gucci Mane, The Clipse, Mac Miller, Terminology, Currensy and Freddie Gibbs.

His mixtape Barz Vol. 1 was self-released in March 2014, and made available for free online. The album was mixed by DJ T.LO,  and music videos were released as well, with "Rice In Chinatown" directed by Machete Cortez, and "That Ain't My Style" produced by RoadsArt. At the same time, he also launched his website, EraDay.com. In June 2014 JD Era released the music video for his track "Mary," on his #EraFriday series of singles. The music video was directed by DubPlate Films. As of 2014 he is signed to Black Market Music, and is still managed by Major of The Product Management.

Personal life
While based in Mississauga, he has spent time living and working on music in New York City, and has performed in the UK.

Awards and nominations

Discography

Solo albums

Singles

Guest appearances

Further reading

JD Era Discography at Allmusic
JD Era Discography at Discogs

References

External links

JD Era on Facebook
JD Era on Twitter
JD Era on YouTube
JD Era/IceWaterTV on YouTube

Living people
Canadian male rappers
21st-century Canadian rappers
Rappers from Toronto
1985 births
Black Canadian musicians
21st-century Canadian male musicians